Lapo Frangini (born 9 February 2002) is an Italian professional rugby union player who primarily plays prop for Benetton of the United Rugby Championship.

Professional career 
He previously played for clubs such as Firenze Rugby 1931.
Frangini signed for Zebre Parma in April 2022 ahead of the 2022–23 United Rugby Championship as Academy Player.

In 2021 and 2022 Frangini was named in Italy U20s squad for annual Six Nations Under 20s Championship.
On 10 January 2023, he was named in Italy A squad for a uncapped test against Romania A.

References

External links 
All Rugby Profile
It's Rugby UK Profile

2002 births
Living people
People from Bagno a Ripoli
Italian rugby union players
Rugby union hookers
Benetton Rugby players